Cuddington is a civil parish and rural village in the unitary authority of Cheshire West and Chester and the ceremonial county of Cheshire, England, about 4 miles west of Northwich and 13 miles east of Chester.

Within the civil parish of Cuddington are two villages: Cuddington and Sandiway. Sandiway was transferred from Weaverham civil parish in 1936.

Origins
The name Cuddington is Anglo Saxon and derives from the 'Tun of Cuda' which translates to the 'People of Cuda'. Cuddington was designated as a township in the 7th century when the then Archbishop of Canterbury (Theodore) introduced the parochial system within the Parish of Weaverham. Cuddington's church was first set up as a chapel of ease. In ancient times the village was famed for its medicinal spring that has since been lost.

Cuddington and Sandiway have been villages since Delamere forest covered an area from the southern bounday of Frodsham and the Mersey all the way towards Tarporley. There is a Bronze Age burial ground in Norley another local village and Iron Age hill forts at Eddisbury and Oakmere, the ancient highway of Peytefinsty, linking Weaverham with Tarporley and many other local Roman roads confirm the age of the village.

Prior to 1935 the centre of Cuddington was on top of the high ground near to what is now Delamere Park but in that year it merged with Bryn (meaning 'hill' which was between Cuddington and Sandiway), Sandiway and parts of Gorstage becoming the ecclesiastical and civil parish, Cuddington and Sandiway.

Vale Royal Abbey

The early history of Cuddington and Sandiway is also closely associated with Vale Royal Abbey, at nearby Whitegate, once the largest Cistercian abbey church in Britain. Sandiway's most famous building is the "Round Tower Lodge" which was built in the early 19th century as the gatehouse to Vale Royal Abbey. The 18-foot high tower is said to have a concealed dungeon which was used as a hiding place by King Charles II. At that time it stood on a quiet country lane but the road became increasingly important and the tower is now a unique landmark in the central reservation of the A556. Now a listed building with a castellated top and bricked up gothic windows, it was a residence until the 1920s and had a single story extension to its east wall which has since been removed.

Blue Cap
Very near the round tower is the Blue Cap Inn which is named after a fox hound. The Cheshire Hounds' kennels were built in Sandiway in 1798, to be replaced in 1834, on the same site, by a new establishment, the Cheshire Forest Kennels. Bluecap was a foxhound owned by John Smith-Barry and in 1762 took part in a famous race, at Newmarket, for a 500-guinea wager with Hugo Meynell, the Master of the Quorn Hunt. Bluecap prevailed and became a local hero and a monument to him stands at the Cheshire Kennels.

Cuddington railway station and the Whitegate Way

The railway transformed the village linking it with Manchester and Chester as well as Winsford with the Whitegate way (now closed and used by walkers, cyclists and as a bridleway). The new railway opened to passengers in 1870 shops and businesses grew up around the station. Wealthy commuters, from Manchester, Chester and Northwich, moved to the village increasing the population and changing its location for the merging in 1935.

Grand houses and John Douglas

The wealth of these commuters can be seen in the grand houses that were built in the area. Many of the village's fine houses were designed by John Douglas who was born in Sandiway, at Park Cottage. He is regarded as one of the outstanding architects of his generation and was an unrivalled master of church design. St John's Church, Sandiway, is built on the site of which he donated to the village. He was also responsible for much of Victorian Chester including the design of the famous Eastgate Clock. Other houses in the village include Hefferson Grange, Dalefords Manor, Gorstage Hall, Sandiway Lodge, Overdale, Nunsmere Hall, Sandiway Manor, Littlefold, Pettypool House and Oakmere Hall (1867).

Present day

Today, Cuddington is a mainly residential village popular for its peaceful rural location and good transport links. The village is surrounded by fields and woodland with many public footpaths (like the Whitegate Way) and the nearby ancient Delamere Forest is popular with walkers and cyclists. With a railway station on the line linking Chester with Manchester situated on the crossing of two main trunk roads, Cuddington is within easy reach of the nearby cities and the UK motorway network.

Petty Pool

Many of the homes above have now become residential homes for the elderly. Petty Pool however has become an outdoor activity centre and college run by the Petty Pool Trust.

Blakemere Craft Centre

Situated in Sandiway the craft centre was once a farm and, after converting to a craft centre, has attracted many visitors to the area with over 25 shops including two pet shops (one specifically for dogs); eclectic art, teddy bears, traditional toys and games, chess sets, carved and turned wood items and handmade cards to mention but a few. There is an aquatic and falconry centre and garden centre.

Notable people
John Douglas (1830–1911) who was the architect responsible for over 500 or so buildings in Cheshire, North Wales and the North West including many of Chester's black-and-white half-timbered buildings and the world-famous Eastgate Clock lived here. He also built the church in Sandiway on land he gave to the village.

Olympic silver medallist Shirley Strong was born in Cuddington and lived in the village throughout her career. Bob Carolgees of Tiswas and Spit the Dog used to live on Kennel Lane in Sandiway. Gary Barlow of Take That once resided on the outskirts of Cuddington at Delamere Manor which was originally the home of the Wilbraham family. The Wilbraham family lived in the area in Delamere House from 1784 to 1939. Where this house once stood is now known as Delamere Park which is a prominent housing estate.

See also
Listed buildings in Cuddington, Cheshire

References

External links

Official website of the village of Cuddington and Sandiway
Cuddington railway station
Sandiway
The Round Tower Sandiway
Oakmere Hall
Delamere Forest
John Douglas
St Johns Church Sandiway

Villages in Cheshire
Civil parishes in Cheshire